Discada is a mixed meat dish popular in the northern Mexican cuisine. The dish includes a mixture of grilled meats cooked on an agricultural plow disk harrow, hence its name. The basic meats for a traditional discada include beef (usually a flank cut), bacon, ham, sausage, and Mexican chorizo. The disk is placed over an open flame, and the ingredients are introduced one at a time. The meats are seasoned and marinated according to the cook's preference and usually include salt, pepper, lime juice, and garlic. Aromatics including white or purple onions, bell peppers, Jalapeno or Serrano peppers, olives, and tomatoes are also used to add flavor and color to the dish. It is usually served with tortillas in tacos or separately on a plate.

The disc
The disc for cooking the meats is usually a disc harrow made of either iron or steel. It is round, wide, angled toward a deeper center, but not as deep as a Chinese wok. This provides a larger surface area for even heat distribution. The original concave disc shape is unaltered, however the disc can have handles or a tripod welded to it for easy access.

The process
Once an ideal cooking heat is reached on the disk (usually medium to low heat works best) the first meat to be introduced is the bacon. This is placed at the center of the concave disk where the heat is concentrated. The natural fat from the bacon will prevent the meats from sticking. Beer or dark cola is added to create a broth for simmering the meats which also acts as a non stick agent. The bacon is placed away from direct heat onto the side of the disk once its cooked, and the sausage links are introduced to the remaining broth. As each piece of meat is removed from the direct heat, the meat's natural juices and the beer or cola create a broth for the next meat piece to be introduced to. Once cooked, the sausage is also set aside and the ham is added. The ham is set aside, and the chorizo is added next. The beef as well as the cook's choice of seasoning is finally added to the collective broth. Each meat is cooked for about 10 to 15 minutes. The beef is covered with a lid during the cooking process to contain its natural flavor and juices. The lid is then removed to allow the broth to reduce, and the meats can now be combined with the beef and the collective broth from the different meats. The onions, peppers, and tomatoes are chopped and added to the mix providing the dish with color and the meats with flavor.

The dish can be served with traditional Mexican side dishes like rice and beans. It is also served with guacamole, and salsa. It can also be accompanied with beer.

See also
 List of meat dishes

References

Meat dishes
Mexican cuisine
Barbecue